The 1999–2000 Arizona Wildcats men's basketball team represented the University of Arizona in the 1999–2000 NCAA Division I men's basketball season. The head coach was Lute Olson. The team played its home games in the McKale Center in Tucson, Arizona, and was a member of the Pacific-10 Conference.  The Wildcats finished the season in first place in the Pacific-10 conference with a 15–3 record.  Arizona reached the Second Round in the 2000 NCAA Division I men's basketball tournament, losing to Wisconsin 59-66 and finishing the season with a 27–7 record.

Roster

Schedule

|-
!colspan=9 style="background:#; color:white;"| Regular season

|-
!colspan=9 style="background:#;"| NCAA tournament

|-

NCAA Division I tournament
West
Arizona (#1 seed) 71, Jackson State 47
Arizona 59, Wisconsin 66

Rankings

References

Arizona Wildcats men's basketball seasons
Arizona Wildcats
Arizona
Arizona Wildcats
Arizona Wildcats